"Don't Say It's Love" is a song by British band Johnny Hates Jazz, released in 1988 as the sixth and final single from their debut studio album Turn Back the Clock. It was written by Clark Datchler and produced by Calvin Hayes and Mike Nocito. "Don't Say It's Love" reached No. 48 in the UK Singles Chart and remained in the top 100 for three weeks. The song did not achieve commercial success in Europe, but reached No. 22 on the European Airplay Top 50 chart.

Release
For its release as a single, a new mix of "Don't Say It's Love" was created by Bob Kraushaar. Lead vocalist and writer Clark Datchler recalled to Will Harris in 2021, "We were never happy with the mix we had on the album. Bob Kraushaar did a fantastic mix of it." Band member Calvin Hayes had originally wanted the song to be released as the follow-up to the band's US debut single "Shattered Dreams" rather than "I Don't Want to Be a Hero".

Music video
The song's music video was directed by Dominic Sena.

Critical reception
On its release, Music & Media described "Don't Say It's Love" as a "melodic pop thrill with a serious groove" and one that is "definitely bound for the top of the charts". Johnny Dee of Record Mirror wrote, "Three nice blokes, in nice suits that make nice records. This is a nice record and I mean that in the nicest possible way!" In a review of Turn Back the Clock, Ernie Long of The Morning Call considered the song, along with the title track, to "help make this accomplished debut effort varied and at times captivating". Billy Warden of The Daily Press described it as "glossy funk in the not-so-grand style of ABC". In a retrospective review, Paul Sinclair of Super Deluxe Edition considered the song to be "slick pop".

Formats
7" single
"Don't Say It's Love" (7" Remix) - 3:43
"Living in the Past" - 3:37

12" single
"Don't Say It's Love" (12" Extended Mix) - 6:10
"Living in the Past" - 3:37
"Don't Say It's Love" (7" Remix) - 3:43

CD single
"Don't Say It's Love" (7" Remix) - 3:43
"Living in the Past" - 3:34
"Don't Say It's Love" (12" Extended Mix) - 6:09
"I Don't Want to Be a Hero" (12" Mix) - 6:33

Personnel
Johnny Hates Jazz
 Clark Datchler
 Mike Nocito 
 Calvin Hayes

Production
 Calvin Hayes, Mike Nocito - producers
 Bob Kraushaar - mixing on "Don't Say It's Love"

Other
 Simon Fowler - photography
 Stylorouge - design

Charts

References

1988 songs
1988 singles
Virgin Records singles
Johnny Hates Jazz songs
Songs written by Clark Datchler